The LG Optimus series is a series of smartphones and tablet computers manufactured by LG Electronics. Optimus-branded devices have been produced running both the Android and Windows Phone 7 operating systems.

Android
 LG Optimus, alternatively titled LG Optimus GT540, LG Loop, or LG Swift
 LG Optimus Q, alternatively titled LG LU2300
 LG Optimus Pad, a tablet released in May 2011 
 LG Optimus Pad LTE, an LTE-capable successor tablet released in January 2012 in South Korea
 LG Optimus 2X, the first dual-core smartphone in the series, released in February 2011
 LG Optimus 4X HD, a quad-core successor launched in October 2012
 LG Optimus 3D, released in July 2011
 LG Optimus 3D Max, successor announced in Mobile World Congress 2012
 LG Optimus M
 LG Optimus Me
 LG Optimus Zip, released by Verizon Wireless on September 22, 2011
 LG Optimus Slider, released by Virgin Mobile USA on October 17, 2011.
 LG Optimus LTE (alternatively LG Optimus True HD LTE), released in December 2011
 LG Optimus LTE 2 was announced in May 2012, to feature 2 GB of RAM
 LG Optimus Vu, announced in February and released in March 2012
 LG Optimus G, LG's 2012 flagship phone, released in November 2012
 LG Optimus G Pro, a larger variation on the Optimus G, featuring a 1080p display; released in March 2013 in Japan and South Korea and May 2013 in the United States

Optimus One 
The LG Optimus One, released in October 2010, is LG's second phone in the Optimus series. Due to network differences between carriers, LG created a sub-series with carrier-specific variants based on the Optimus One. Over two million of the Optimus One and its carrier variants combined have been sold. Additionally, some hardware variants add minor new features:
 LG Optimus Black, released in May 2011
 LG Optimus Chat, featuring a smaller screen and a slide-out QWERTY keyboard
 LG Optimus Chic, with different hardware design plus improved digital camera and modem
 LG Optimus Net, with an improved 800 MHz single-core processor
 LG Optimus Sol, with an improved 1 GHz single-core processor

Optimus L 
LG Optimus L is an Android sub-series launched in 2012. It consists of the following:

First Series
 LG Optimus L2, released in July 2012
 LG Optimus L3, released in February 2012
 LG Optimus L5, released in June 2012
 LG Optimus L7, released in July 2012
 LG Optimus L9(P769), released in October 2012
 LG Optimus L9(MS769), released in July 2013

Second Series

 LG Optimus L1 II, released in April 2013
 LG Optimus L2 II, released in March 2014
 LG Optimus L3 II, released in April 2013
 LG Optimus L4 II, released in July 2013
 LG Optimus L5 II, released in April 2013
 LG Optimus L5 II Dual SIM
 LG Optimus L7 II, released in March 2013
 LG Optimus L9 II, released in October 2013

Third Series
 LG Optimus L20
 LG Optimus L30 Sporty
 LG Optimus L35
 LG Optimus L40
 LG Optimus L50 Sporty
 LG Optimus L60
 LG Optimus L65
 LG Optimus L70
 LG Optimus L80
 LG Optimus L90

And until fourth series, LG has started a new L product line.
 LG L Fino, released in September 2014
 LG L Bello, released in September 2014

Optimus F 
LG Optimus F is an Android sub-series announced on February 21, 2013. It uses the same naming conventions as its predecessor, the Optimus L lineup. It includes the following:
 LG Optimus F3, released in June 2013
 LG Optimus F3Q, released in February 2014
 LG Optimus F5, released in May 2013 
 LG Optimus F6, model numbers D500 and MS500, released in September 2013
 LG Optimus F7, released in June 2013
 LG F60, released in 2014
 LG F70, latest model in F series, released in 2014

Optimus G 

The Optimus G sub-series was introduced for LG's high-end devices in 2012. In 2013, after releasing two devices carrying the Optimus G branding, future products (such as the LG G2) dropped the Optimus brand entirely as part of a new separate G line.

LG Optimus G
LG Optimus G Pro
LG G Pro 2
LG G2
LG G Flex
LG G Pad 8.3
LG G3
LG G Flex 2
LG G4
LG G5
LG G6
LG G7 ThinQ
LG G8 ThinQ

Optimus Vu

The Optimus Vu sub-series was introduced for LG's stylus-enabled devices in 2012.
LG Optimus Vu
LG Optimus Vu II
LG Optimus Vu III

Windows Phone 
LG only released two LG Optimus phones with the Windows Phone operating system, compared to 20 unique Android smartphones. The first of these was the LG Optimus 7, released in November 2010. It was followed by the LG Quantum, alternatively Optimus 7Q or Optimus Quantum, a variant with a physical keyboard.

References

LG Electronics mobile phones
Android (operating system) devices